Gianni Pedrizzetti (born 7 September 1963 in Prato, Italy) is an Italian engineer who is a professor in fluid mechanics at the University of Trieste. His research is the application of fluid mechanics to cardiovascular science.

Biography
Pedrizzetti earned his BS and MS degree in 1987 from the University of Florence in the Faculty of Engineering. In 1992 he received the title of Doctor of Philosophy, in hydrodynamics, from the University of Padova with studies on vortex dynamics and turbulence. He carried out postdoctoral studies at the University of California in San Diego (INLS) in 1992, working on theoretical aspects of turbulence, and at the Universidad Politecnica de Madrid (ETSIA) in 1994. Pedrizzetti has also been a visiting scientist at the University of San Diego (US) in 1995 and a visiting senior research associate at the University of Cambridge (UK) in 1998, while he was a permanent researcher at the University of Firenze from 1992 to 1998. Soon after, he became associate professor at the University of Trieste. In 2006 Pedrizzetti obtained the title of full professor and continued his academic activities in biomechanics at the University of Trieste. Currently, he also serves as adjunct professor in bioengineering in the Faculty of Medicine at the University of Florence.

References

 http://www.dica.univ.trieste.it/perspage/gianni/
 http://www.dica.univ.trieste.it/perspage/gianni/education.htm
 https://web.archive.org/web/20120325124825/http://www.labome.org/expert/italy/university/pedrizzetti/gianni-pedrizzetti-826422.html
 http://patent.ipexl.com/inventor/Gianni_Pedrizzetti_1.html
 http://web.tiscali.it/muenribloce/

External links 
 http://kheradvar.eng.uci.edu/people.php?id=gpedrizz

1963 births
Living people
Italian engineers